The 1988 Clemson Tigers football team represented Clemson University during the 1988 NCAA Division I-A football season.

Schedule

Rankings

Personnel

Game summaries

Florida State

Florida Citrus Bowl (vs. Oklahoma)

Jamelle Holieway made the start in his final collegiate game.

References

Clemson
Clemson Tigers football seasons
Atlantic Coast Conference football champion seasons
Citrus Bowl champion seasons
Clemson Tigers football